This article lists the prime ministers of Hungary from when the first Prime Minister (in the modern sense), Lajos Batthyány, took office in 1848 (during the Hungarian Revolution of 1848) until the present day. The prime minister of Hungary is head of the Government of Hungary. On 30 November 2020, Viktor Orbán became the longest serving prime minister in the modern era.

Kingdom of Hungary (1848–1849)
Parties

Hungarian State (1849)
Parties

After the collapse of the Hungarian Revolution of 1848, the restored Hungarian Kingdom became an integral part of the Austrian Empire until 1867, when dual Austro-Hungarian Monarchy was created and the Hungarian Kingdom was organized as Lands of the Crown of Saint Stephen.

Lands of the Crown of Saint Stephen (1867–1918)
Parties

First Hungarian Republic (1918–1919)
Parties

Hungarian Soviet Republic (1919)
Parties

Counter-revolutionary governments (1919)
Parties

Hungarian Republic (1919–1920)
Parties

Kingdom of Hungary (1920–1946)
Parties

Government of National Unity (1944–1945)
Parties

Soviet-backed provisional governments (1944–1946)
Parties

 Left Budapest on 9 December 1944
 At Debrecen to 11 April 1945

Hungarian Republic (1946–1949)
Parties

Hungarian People's Republic (1949–1989)

Chairman of the Council of Ministers

Parties

Hungarian Republic / Hungary (from 1989)
Parties

 FKGP split into two groups on 24 February 1992. EKGP (Group of 33 then 36 MPs) continued to support the government, while FKGP (Group of 12 then 10 MPs) went into opposition.
 SZDSZ left the Gyurcsány II Cabinet on 20 April 2008.
 The Bajnai Cabinet was supported externally by SZDSZ.

Timeline

Revolution of 1848

Lands of the Crown of St. Stephen

First Hungarian Republic/Hungarian Soviet Republic

Kingdom of Hungary

Second Hungarian Republic

Hungarian People's Republic

Third Hungarian Republic

See also
 List of Hungarian monarchs
 List of heads of state of Hungary
 List of palatines of Hungary
 List of prime ministers of Hungary by tenure
 List of prime ministers of Hungary (graphical)
 Records of prime ministers of Hungary

Notes

Sources
 Bölöny, József – Hubai, László: Magyarország kormányai 1848–2004 [Cabinets of Hungary 1848–2004], Akadémiai Kiadó, Budapest, 2004 (5th edition).
 Izsák, Alajos – Pölöskei, Ferenc – Romsics, Ignác – Urbán, Aladár: Magyar miniszterelnökök 1848–2002 [Prime ministers of Hungary 1848–2002], Kossuth Kiadó, Budapest, 2003.
 Markó, László: A magyar állam főméltóságai Szent Istvántól napjainkig – Életrajzi Lexikon [The High Officers of the Hungarian State from Saint Stephen to the Present Days – A Biographical Encyclopedia] (2nd edition); Helikon Kiadó Kft., 2006, Budapest; .

External links
 Rulers.org

References

Hungary, List of Prime Ministers of

Prime Ministers